The Silent Knight (Brian Kent) is a fictional medieval hero appearing in comic books published by DC Comics. The character first appeared in The Brave and the Bold #1 (August 1955) and was created by Robert Kanigher and Irv Novick. He was one of three historical fiction characters to premiere in the first issue (the other two being Golden Gladiator and the Viking Prince).

Fictional character biography
The Silent Knight is a young handsome man named Brian Kent, living in sixth-century Great Britain. At a jousting tournament, the evil Sir Oswald Bane kills Brian's feudal lord father Sir Edwin, claiming it to be an accident. Before he dies, Edwin instructs Brian to continue his rule and look after the people. Sir Oswald hears this and sets Brian under the knightly training of Sir Grot, a friend of Edwin's. Brian excels at his lessons, but fearing that Sir Oswald will kill him if the boy becomes too good, Grot publicly derides the boy as an oaf.

While looking for one of Sir Oswald's prize hawks in the Forest Perilous, Brian finds a trunk with a suit of silver armor, a sword, a red helmet, and shield. He puts the armor on and discovers that it is a perfect fit. He hears travelers being threatened by Sir Oswald's men-at-arms, and comes to their aid, defeating the soldiers without uttering a word. When asked his name, he stays silent to prevent the soldiers from identifying him to Sir Oswald. Hence, he becomes known as "the Silent Knight". He keeps the armor hidden in the Forest Perilous and hides his secret even from Sir Grot.

The Silent Knight also fought outlaws and had adventures involving King Arthur and the Knights of the Round Table. He also met the evil Morgaine le Fey. Lady Celia who loved the Silent Knight suspected he was seemingly dull Brian, and even after being made to believe he couldn't be, was constantly troubled by similarities between the pair.

Current status
The Silent Knight made a minor appearance during a time travel storyline.

In the 1990s Hawkman series, Brian, with his hawk-motif armor and trained falcon, was revealed to be a past avatar of the Hawk-God. A further retcon in the 2000s Hawkman implied he was a past incarnation of Hawkman Carter Hall.

The version of Sir Gawain in Ystina's "Ur-Camelot" is referred to in a caption as "the silent knight, attended by his wondrous hawks".

The Silent Knight assists a time-traveling Superman in destroying a magic artifact. Superman has been warned by Merlin not to let any harm befall the knight and is pleased to learn his name at the end of their adventure, as Superman's adopted surname is Kent. This, and an "inexplicable kinship" felt by Brian imply that he is an ancestor of Superman's adoptive father, Jonathan Kent.

Powers and abilities
The Silent Knight is a master of the knightly skills of tilting, horsemanship, hawking, fencing, archery and chivalry. In his origin story, Brian's talent for swordfighting enables him to out-fight some of the king's soldiers. In another story, "The Sword in the Lake", Brian demonstrates great strength when he dives to the bottom of a lake in full armor to retrieve a necklace and resurfaces. He shows loyalty to the knightly code of conduct by never taking unfair advantage of an opponent. For that reason, he never uses a weapon with a greater reach than his adversary's.

References

Adventure Heroes: Legendary Characters from Odysseus to James Bond, page 236-237
Who's Who The Definitive Directory of The DC Universe Volume XXI, page 3

Arthurian characters
Arthurian comics
DC Comics superheroes
DC Comics fantasy characters
Fictional knights
Fictional swordfighters in comics
Comics characters introduced in 1955
Characters created by Robert Kanigher
Fictional archers